Trachylepis wingati, also known commonly as Wingate's skink, is a species of lizard in the family Scincidae. The species is indigenous to northeastern Africa.

Etymology
The specific name, wingati, is in honor of Francis Reginald Wingate, who was a General in the British Army and the first British Governor of Sudan.

Geographic range
T. wingati is found in Ethiopia and Sudan.

Description
The tail is slightly longer than the SVL.

Reproduction
The mode of reproduction of T. wingati is unknown.

References

Further reading
Bauer AM (2003). "On the identity of Lacerta punctata Linnaeus 1758, the type species of the genus Euprepis Wagler 1830, and the generic assignment of Afro-Malagasy skinks". African Journal of Herpetology 52 (1): 1–7. (Trachylepis wingati, new combination).
Werner F (1908). "Ergebnisse der mit Subvention aus der Erbschaft Treitl unternommenen zoologischen Forschungsreise Dr. Franz Werner's nach dem ägyptischen Sudan und Nord-Uganda. XII. Die Reptilien und Amphibien ". Sitzungsberichte der Mathematisch-Naturwissenschaftlichen Klasse der Kaiserlichen Akademie der Wissenschaften 116: 1823–1926 + Plates I–IV. (Mabuia wingatii, new species, pp. 1848–1850 + Plate II, figures 3, 3a). (in German).

Trachylepis
Reptiles described in 1908
Taxa named by Franz Werner